"The Bris" is the 69th episode of the sitcom Seinfeld. It is the fifth episode of the fifth season, and first aired on October 14, 1993. The story centers on the bris for the newborn child of two of Jerry and Elaine's friends. Jerry and Elaine struggle in the role of godparents, while Kramer objects to the entire concept of the bris and attempts to prevent the baby from being circumcised.

Plot
Jerry, Elaine, George, and Kramer go to meet friends Stan and Myra, who have just had a baby. George gets a parking spot right in front of the hospital. A mental patient jumps from the roof and lands on it. George attempts to get the hospital to pay for the damages, but the director refuses and insinuates that George is running a scam. Meanwhile, Kramer stumbles into the wrong room at the hospital (1937 instead of 1397) and becomes convinced that he has seen a "pig man" (half-pig, half-man). He espouses a conspiracy theory concerning the government and genetic mutation leading to pig-men armies.

Jerry and Elaine agree to be the newborn baby's godparents. Jerry uses the role as a prompt to perform impersonations of Marlon Brando's character from The Godfather, but his friends are severely unimpressed. They are obligated to arrange the bris, which involves Elaine booking a mohel and Jerry holding the baby during the circumcision. Kramer, disturbed by the concept of the bris, upsets the mother with descriptions of circumcision and seizes the baby in an unsuccessful rescue attempt. The mohel is extremely irritable and high-strung and implies that he was charged with malpractice due to a botched circumcision on at least one previous occasion. Made increasingly nervous by this, Jerry flinches as the circumcision gets underway, and the twitching mohel cuts Jerry's finger. The four go to the hospital, where the baby's circumcision is performed and the parents have to break up a fight between Jerry and the mohel. Jerry's finger is stitched up. Kramer finds the "pig man" and "liberates" him from the hospital. The "pig man" steals George's car, which was again conveniently parked. A sheepish Kramer admits that the "pig man" is actually "a fat little mental patient".

Stan and Myra strip Jerry and Elaine of their role as godparents, deciding they prefer Kramer due to the concern he expressed for the baby. Pleased, Kramer performs an off-the-cuff impersonation of The Godfather which far eclipses Jerry's.

Production
The portrayal of the mohel was considered offensive to Jason Alexander, who is Jewish. Alexander hated the characterization and argued with Larry David, threatening to boycott the episode if he did not rewrite the character. David softened the portrayal, but Alexander refused to appear in any scenes with the character. Alexander does appear in the bris scene with the mohel character and even converses with him before passing out.

References

External links 
 

Seinfeld (season 5) episodes
1993 American television episodes
Jewish comedy and humor
Works based on The Godfather